The 2001 FIFA World Player of the Year award was won by Luís Figo by the slim margin of 12 points. David Beckham was again in the second place. The gala was hosted at the TV Production Centre in Zurich, on December 17, 2001. 130 national team coaches, based on the current FIFA Men's World Ranking were chosen to vote. For the first time the Women's award was given out, won by Mia Hamm.

Results

Men

Women

References

External links
FIFA World Player 2001 (pdf)

FIFA World Player of the Year
FIFA World Player of the Year
Women's association football trophies and awards
2001 in women's association football